Bobby Thomas Hopkinson (born 3 July 1990) is a professional English footballer.

Career
Hopkinson started his career as a youth player at Plymouth Argyle, signing on scholarship forms in July 2006 under Ian Holloway. Hopkinson was a member of the Pilgrims' side that reached the FA Youth Cup quarter-finals in 2007–08. He did not make a first team appearance, and was released at the end of the 2007–08 season.

Following his release from Plymouth, Hopkinson joined Southern League Premier Division team Tiverton Town where he spent the 2008–09 season. At the end of the season Hopkinson was awarded the "Travel Club Player of The Year" award and the "WWW Player of The Year" award.

After a successful trial he joined League Two side Aldershot Town in August 2009 on non-contract terms. Aldershot manager Gary Waddock praised his commitment saying "Bobby and his family have shown a lot of commitment". He made his debut for Aldershot Town on 6 October against Hereford United in their 2–2 away draw in the Football League Trophy Southern Section Second Round, replacing Scott Donnelly in the 68th minute as a substitute. Hereford went on to win the game 4–3 in a penalty shootout. Hopkinson made his debut in the Football League in Aldershot's subsequent League Two game against Morecambe in the 4–1 home win on 10 October. He replaced Scott Donnelly again as a substitute in the 82nd minute.

On 15 January 2010, it was announced that Southern Football League Premier Division side Farnborough had signed Hopkinson on dual registration forms with Aldershot Town. Hopkinson made his debut the next day, when he came on as a substitute in Farnborough's 2–1 win against Clevedon Town. Three days later Hopkinson scored his first goal for Farnborough, after he came on as a substitute against Banbury United.

On 5 March, Aldershot Town announced that Hopkinson had left the club, and he was linked with a return to Tiverton.

Shortly following the end of the season, it was announced that Hopkinson signed a two-year deal at the club he was on loan at for the last few weeks of the season, Havant & Waterlooville. Staying at Havant for the 2010–11 season, Hopkinson made 34 league appearances, five of which came from the substitutes' bench, and scored two goals.

He signed for Wessex League Premier Division club Horndean in August 2011 on loan. Hopkinson signed for Truro City in September 2012. But left the club by mutual consent on 7 February 2013. He later played for Plymstock United, Witheridge, Bodmin Town, Tavistock, Launceston in 2015 and now plays for Camelford

References

External links
Aldershot Town profile

Living people
1990 births
English footballers
Plymouth Argyle F.C. players
Tiverton Town F.C. players
Aldershot Town F.C. players
Farnborough F.C. players
Havant & Waterlooville F.C. players
Horndean F.C. players
Truro City F.C. players
Witheridge F.C. players
Bodmin Town F.C. players
Tavistock A.F.C. players
Launceston F.C. players
English Football League players
Association football midfielders
Wessex Football League players